Seljestad is a village in Ullensvang municipality in Vestland county, Norway. The European route E134 highway passes through the village. There were about 29 permanent residents of Seljestad in 2001, but the area has a lot of vacation cabins and the Seljestad hotel in the area, so there can be a large temporary population at certain times of the year.

References

Villages in Vestland
Ullensvang